Greux is a commune in the Vosges department in Grand Est in northeastern France.

See also 
 Communes of the Vosges department

References 

Communes of Vosges (department)